Dennis J. Murray is an American academic administrator who was the third President of Marist College from 1979–2016 and returned to that role on an interim basis from June 19, 2019 to October 2021. Murray had been the university's President Emeritus since July 1, 2016. In February, 2015, Murray had given advanced notice to the board of trustees, deciding to relinquish his daily role and responsibilities as the college's president when his contract was set to expire on June 30, 2016.

Murray had been Marist's president during the academic years spanning from 1979 through the Spring of 2016.

Murray received a bachelor's degree in political science from California State University, Long Beach and his master's degree and Ph.D. in public administration from the University of Southern California.

Prior to his appointment at Marist, Dr. Murray taught at the USC School of International and Public Affairs, and served as Director of University Relations and Executive Assistant to the President at California State University, Long Beach and as Vice President for Development at Whittier College.

Selected honors and awards
Franciscan Award from the Sisters of St. Francis
Americanism Award from the Anti-Defamation League
Eleanor Roosevelt Val-Kill Medal, 1996

References

Heads of universities and colleges in the United States
California State University, Long Beach alumni
Living people
Marist College people
USC Sol Price School of Public Policy alumni
Whittier College people
1950 births